Bishop is an unincorporated community in Worcester County, Maryland, United States. Bishop is located at the intersection of U.S. Route 113 and Maryland Route 367, just south of the Delaware state line.

References

Unincorporated communities in Worcester County, Maryland
Unincorporated communities in Maryland